Véronique Renties (born 3 July 1960 at Valenciennes) is a former French athlete, who specialized in the middle distances.

Biography  
She won five French Championship Athletic titles:   two in  the 800 meters in 1979 and 1980 and three in the 1500 meters in 1978, 1979 and 1980.

She held the French junior record for 1000 meters in 2:37.2 (1979).

Prize list  
 French Championships in Athletics   :  
 2 times winner 800 m in 1979 and 1980.   
 3 times winner of 1,500 m in 1978,  1979 and 1980.

Records

Notes and references  
 Docathlé2003, Fédération française d'athlétisme, 2003, p. 429

1960 births
Sportspeople from Valenciennes
Living people
French female middle-distance runners
Mediterranean Games silver medalists for France
Mediterranean Games medalists in athletics
Athletes (track and field) at the 1979 Mediterranean Games